Monroe Township is a township in southern Middlesex County, in the U.S. state of New Jersey. The township is centrally located within the Raritan Valley region and is one of the outer-ring suburbs of the New York metropolitan area. As of the 2020 United States census, the township's population was 48,594, its highest decennial count ever and an increase of 9,462 (+24.2%) from the 2010 census count of 39,132, which in turn reflected an increase of 11,133 (+39.8%) from the 27,999 from the 27,999 counted at the 2000 census. Monroe Township also comprises the largest land area of any municipality in Middlesex County, at approximately 42 square miles.

Monroe Township was incorporated as a township by an act of the New Jersey Legislature on April 9, 1838, from portions of South Amboy Township, based on the results of a referendum held that same day. Portions of the township were taken to form East Brunswick (February 28, 1860), Cranbury (March 7, 1872), and Jamesburg (March 19, 1887).

There are several age-restricted communities in Monroe Township. Despite significant senior citizen population growth, the median age in Monroe has changed from 52.5 in 1990, increasing to 58.9 in 2000, before decreasing to 53.2 in 2010, as more growth recently has resulted from single-family detached homes than from senior citizen developments.

The municipality experienced the third-largest increase in population in the state between 2010 and 2014, growing by 3,678 to 42,810, following two more urban locations, Jersey City and Elizabeth. Monroe Township has been ranked as one of the safest 
cities in the United States.

History
The earliest settlers in what would become Monroe Township were the Lenape Native Americans.

Monroe Township was founded in April 1838 and named in honor of the fifth President of the United States, James Monroe.

For many decades, the township area was largely a farming community. After parts of the township grew into the more densely packed neighborhoods of Helmetta, Jamesburg, and Spotswood in the late 19th century, they seceded. Railroads came into Monroe from just about the very beginning, starting with the Camden and Amboy Rail Road in the 1830s and 1840s.

In 1905, Bernarr Macfadden, the proponent of physical culture, came to the part of Monroe near Helmetta and Spotswood, and attempted to set up a camp called "Physical Culture City", where he could teach his beliefs in relative peace. However, in 1907, Macfadden was arrested for distribution of pornography and the camp dissolved. The area of this camp became the Outcalt neighborhood.

The New Jersey State Home for Boys, later known as the Training School for Boys, and now the New Jersey Training School for Boys was established near Jamesburg. It was opened in 1867 as a home for troubled youth; however, by the mid-20th century, its purpose was to incarcerate juvenile delinquents. One of the better known residents of the State Home was Rubin "Hurricane" Carter. Clarence Clemons of Bruce Springsteen and the E Street Band was a counselor there for many years during the 1960s before he found fame as a sax player with Springsteen.

The township became more suburban between 1960 and 1968, when the New Jersey Turnpike opened up Exit 8A in the western part of Monroe, in conjunction with the effort to develop the Leisure World age-restricted community of Rossmoor. Since then, at least five more communities for senior citizens have joined Rossmoor: Concordia, Clearbrook, Greenbriar at Whittingham, The Ponds, Encore and the Regency at Monroe, with more under development. At the same time, and over the next few decades, suburban communities for people of all ages spread into the northern parts of Monroe Township, prompting the expansion of several schools and the construction of new ones. Since 1980, in addition to the age restricted communities, Monroe has added shopping centers, a synagogue, a recreation center, and a new library.

Circa 1980, it was found that a landfill which was located at the corner of what is now Spotswood Gravel Hill Road and Carnegie Street, contaminated the ground water which forced Outcalt residents to get municipal-supplied water. The  site had been run as a landfill for municipal waste since 1955, first by the township and later by an independent operator.

On March 22, 2006, ten residents of Monroe Township, from The Ponds retirement community, were killed in a tour bus accident in the Andes mountains in northern Chile. The tour had been arranged by Jewish organization B'nai B'rith.

Since the early 2000s, Monroe has experienced a surge in residential development. New communities are being erected, usually around Route 33 and the New Jersey Turnpike. Portions of Monroe's farmland are receiving commercial zoning. Roads have been widened to allow for the extra vehicular volume. Warehouses are being/have been constructed in the last few years along CR 535, located near the 8A toll gate. The northern section of the township is already developed, with developers heading further south in Monroe to start new communities. New adult communities have set ground in central Monroe, along Route 33 and on CR 615. While these new senior citizen housing units are being built, luxury homes are also being constructed.

There is an ongoing expansion of the Monroe Township High School that is relocating it onto portions of Thompson Park. The controversy that led to the study involved a Lenape settlement, Bethel Indian Town, which protesters contended existed on the site, whereas supporters of the move of the high school claimed that Bethel Indian Town was a half-mile away. In late April 2008, construction started on the new high school, which then opened in September 2011. The old high school building is now being reused as the middle school.

By early 2008, the State Preservation Office and New Jersey Department of Environmental Protection gave full sanction to the de-accession of the land as a protected park. Ground breaking began immediately, only to be halted in June 2008 when additional remains were found. The consultant identified these stone foundation remains as a 19th-century farmstead, with no earlier association.

The township's Route 33 Land Development Task Force is considering options for developing the area of land along Route 33 from the township's border with East Windsor to Millstone Township.

This proposal would include the construction of new luxury houses, a new grocery store, a baseball park, a performing arts center, a bus stop, new restaurants, and new businesses.

In May 2021, Monroe Township coordinated a financial relief effort toward the COVID-19 pandemic in India.

Geography

According to the United States Census Bureau, the township had a total area of 42.19 square miles (109.26 km2), including 41.94 square miles (108.63 km2) of land and 0.24 square miles (0.63 km2) of water (0.58%). It is the largest municipality in Middlesex County in terms of total area.

Clearbrook (with a 2010 population of 2,667), Concordia (3,092 in 2010), Encore at Monroe, Forsgate, Monroe Manor, Regency at Monroe, Renaissance at Monroe, Rossmoor (2,666 as of 2010), Stonebridge, The Ponds, and Whittingham (2,476 in 2010) are unincorporated communities and census-designated places (CDPs) located within Monroe Township.

Monroe completely surrounds Jamesburg, making it part of 21 pairs of "doughnut towns" in the state, where one municipality entirely surrounds another. The township borders Cranbury Township, East Brunswick Township, Helmetta, Old Bridge Township, South Brunswick Township, and Spotswood in Middlesex County; East Windsor Township in Mercer County; and Manalapan Township and Millstone Township in Monmouth County.

Neighborhoods and historical place names
Monroe Township is not officially broken down into traditional neighborhoods (the Census-designated places oriented around active adult communities notwithstanding), but over the years, residents have given names to various unincorporated neighborhoods within the township. Three common names heard in the township are Mill Lake Manor (an area centered on Monmouth Road and 10th Avenue) and Outcalt (in the northern part of the township, near Spotswood and Helmetta). For those who have lived in Mill Lake Manor, the area is broken down further into the "Old" and "New" Manor (split by Monmouth Road on the east and west sides, the Old being east and the New being the west side). The Manor also encompasses the developments of Inwood. The neighborhood east of Spotswood-Englishtown Road, centered on Monmouth Road, extending down to 1st Avenue, is called North Manor or Manor Heights.

Unincorporated communities, localities and place names located partially or completely within the township include Applegarth, Gravel Hill (also spelled as Gravelhill), Half Acre (home to the retirement communities of Concordia and Whittingham), Hoffman, Jamesburg Gardens, Lower Jamesburg, Matchaponix, Middlesex Downs, Mounts Mills, Old Church, Outcalt, Pineview Estates, Prospect Plains (home to the retirement communities of Rossmoor and Clearbrook), Spotswood Manor, Texas, and Wyckoffs Mills.

Historical railroads (no longer active):
 Camden and Amboy Railroad
 Freehold and Jamesburg Railroad
 Pennsylvania Railroad Amboy Division (formerly the Camden and Amboy Railroad)
 Jamesurg Railroad Amboy Division (formerly the Freehold and Jamesburg Railroad)

Demographics

As of the 2020 United States census, there were 48,594 people and 20,289 occupied housing units in the township.
Monroe Township, like Middlesex County overall, has experienced a rapid growth rate in its Indian American population, with an estimated 5,943 (13.6%) as of 2017, which was 23 times the 256 (0.9%) counted as of the 2000 Census; and Diwali is celebrated by the township as a Hindu holiday. Monroe has simultaneously emerged as a growing hub for congregations of Jewish Americans, hosting since 2010 the largest public menorah in New Jersey to celebrate Chanukah.

2010 census

The Census Bureau's 2006–2010 American Community Survey showed that (in 2010 inflation-adjusted dollars) median household income was $74,202 (with a margin of error of +/− $3,156) and the median family income was $99,727 (+/− $5,718). Males had a median income of $84,790 (+/− $4,546) versus $57,058 (+/− $4,789) for females. The per capita income for the borough was $41,959 (+/− $1,676). About 2.6% of families and 3.9% of the population were below the poverty line, including 3.9% of those under age 18 and 4.4% of those age 65 or over.

2000 census

As of the 2000 United States census there were 27,999 people, 12,536 households, and 8,236 families residing in the township. The population density was 667.6 people per square mile (257.8/km2). There were 13,259 housing units at an average density of 316.1 per square mile (122.1/km2). The racial makeup of the township was 93.31% White, 2.93% African American, 0.06% Native American, 2.34% Asian, 0.09% Pacific Islander, 0.68% from other races, and 0.60% from two or more races. Hispanic or Latino of any race were 2.38% of the population.

There were 12,536 households, out of which 15.9% had children under the age of 18 living with them, 60.6% were married couples living together, 3.9% had a female householder with no husband present, and 34.3% were non-families. 32.0% of all households were made up of individuals, and 28.0% had someone living alone who was 65 years of age or older. The average household size was 2.15 and the average family size was 2.70.

In the township the population was spread out, with 16.0% under the age of 18, 4.2% from 18 to 24, 16.3% from 25 to 44, 20.0% from 45 to 64, and 43.5% who were 65 years of age or older. The median age was 59 years. For every 100 females, there were 84.8 males. For every 100 females age 18 and over, there were 79.3 males.

The median income for a household in the township was $53,306, and the median income for a family was $68,479. Males had a median income of $56,431 versus $35,857 for females. The per capita income for the township was $31,772. About 1.3% of families and 3.3% of the population were below the poverty line, including 2.9% of those under age 18 and 3.0% of those age 65 or over.

Parks and recreation

Thompson Park is a  park, connected to sports fields operated by Monroe Township High School, and straddles both Monroe Township and Jamesburg. It is the largest park in the Middlesex County Park System, and features Lake Manalapan where fisherman and fisherwoman could fish (motorboats are not allowed on the lake, but rowing is permitted). The park also has its own dog park, various hiking trails, and a small fenced in zoo that has various native and exotic animals on display.

Other parks in the township include Veteran's Park Playground and Spray Park, James Monroe Memorial Park, Thomas L. Allen Softball Complex, Daniel P. Ryan Field, and Monroe Township Soccer Complex.

Government

Local government 
Monroe Township is governed within the Faulkner Act, formally known as the Optional Municipal Charter Law, under the Mayor-Council system of New Jersey municipal government. The township is one of 71 municipalities (of the 564) statewide governed under this form. The governing body is comprised of a directly-elected mayor and a five-member township council, all elected on a partisan basis in odd-numbered years as part of the November general election. There are three township council seats elected from wards, which come up for vote together, followed two years later by the two at-large seats and the mayoral seat.

, the Mayor of Monroe Township is Democrat Stephen Dalina, who was elected to serve an unexpired term of office ending December 31, 2023. Members of the Township Council are Council President Miriam Cohen (D, 2023; at-large), Vice President Terence G. Van Dzura (D, 2023; at-large, elected to serve an unexpired term), Charles G. Dipierro (R, 2025; Ward 3), Elizabeth A. "Betty" Schneider (D, 2025; Ward 1) and Rupa P. Siegel (D, 2025; Ward 2).

In January 2021, the Township Council selected councilmember Stephen Dalina from a list of three candidates nominated to fill the seat as mayor expiring in December 2023 that became vacant following the death of Gerald Tamburro the previous month. In February 2021, Terence Van Dzura was selected  from the three candidates nominated to fill the at-large seat expiring in December 2023 that had been held by Dalina until he took office as mayor. Dalina and Van Dzura served on an interim basis until the November 2021 general election, when they were elected to serve the balance of the term of office.

In March 2017, the Township Council selected Miriam Cohen from a list of three candidates nominated by the Democratic municipal committee to fill the seat expiring in December 2019 that was vacated the previous month by Leslie Koppel when she took office on the Middlesex County Board of Chosen Freeholders. In November 2017, Cohen was elected to serve the balance of the term of office.

In January 2016, the Township Council appointed Blaise Dipierro to fill the Second Ward seat expiring in December 2017 that had been held by Gerald W. Tamburro until he stepped down to take office as mayor; Dipierro will serve on an interim basis until the November 2016 general election, when voters will choose a candidate to serve the balance of the term of office.

State government 
The New Jersey Juvenile Justice Commission operates the New Jersey Training School, a juvenile detention center for boys, in the township. In 2018, the state approved funding to close the two Civil War-era youth prisons in New Jersey. It has not been decided yet what will be done with the property after its closure.

Federal, state and county representation 
Monroe Township is located in the 12th Congressional District and is part of New Jersey's 14th state legislative district.

 

Middlesex County is governed by a Board of County Commissioners, whose seven members are elected at-large on a partisan basis to serve three-year terms of office on a staggered basis, with either two or three seats coming up for election each year as part of the November general election. At an annual reorganization meeting held in January, the board selects from among its members a commissioner director and deputy director. , Middlesex County's Commissioners (with party affiliation, term-end year, and residence listed in parentheses) are 
Commissioner Director Ronald G. Rios (D, Carteret, term as commissioner ends December 31, 2024; term as commissioner director ends 2022),
Commissioner Deputy Director Shanti Narra (D, North Brunswick, term as commissioner ends 2024; term as deputy director ends 2022),
Claribel A. "Clary" Azcona-Barber (D, New Brunswick, 2022),
Charles Kenny (D, Woodbridge Township, 2022),
Leslie Koppel (D, Monroe Township, 2023),
Chanelle Scott McCullum (D, Piscataway, 2024) and 
Charles E. Tomaro (D, Edison, 2023).
Constitutional officers are
County Clerk Nancy Pinkin (D, 2025, East Brunswick),
Sheriff Mildred S. Scott (D, 2022, Piscataway) and 
Surrogate Claribel Cortes (D, 2026; North Brunswick).

Politics
As of March 2011, there were a total of 29,992 registered voters in Monroe Township, of which 11,616 (38.7%) were registered as Democrats, 5,448 (18.2%) were registered as Republicans and 12,912 (43.1%) were registered as Unaffiliated. There were 16 voters registered as either Libertarians or Greens.

In the 2012 presidential election, Democrat Barack Obama received 53.5% of the vote (12,113 cast), ahead of Republican Mitt Romney with 45.8% (10,361 votes), and other candidates with 0.7% (166 votes), among the 22,840 ballots cast by the township's 31,297 registered voters (200 ballots were spoiled), for a turnout of 73.0%. In the 2008 presidential election, Democrat Barack Obama received 53.9% of the vote (12,319 cast), ahead of Republican John McCain with 44.4% (10,150 votes) and other candidates with 0.7% (169 votes), among the 22,875 ballots cast by the township's 29,295 registered voters, for a turnout of 78.1%. In the 2004 presidential election, Democrat John Kerry received 55.7% of the vote (11,363 ballots cast), outpolling Republican George W. Bush with 43.2% (8,806 votes) and other candidates with 0.4% (103 votes), among the 20,405 ballots cast by the township's 25,675 registered voters, for a turnout percentage of 79.5.

{| align="center" border="2" cellpadding="4" cellspacing="0" style="float:right; margin: 1em 1em 1em 0; border: 1px #aaa solid; border-collapse: collapse; font-size: 95%;"
|+ Gubernatorial Elections Results
|- bgcolor=lightgrey
! Year
!Republican
!Democratic
!Third Parties
|-
| style="text-aligncenter;" |2017
| style="text-aligncenter;" |48.9% 7,982
| style="text-aligncenter;" |49.4% 8,066
| style="text-align:center; background:honeyDew;" |1.7% 272
|-
| style="text-aligncenter;" |2013
| style="text-aligncenter;" |64.0% 10,209
| style="text-aligncenter;" |35.2% 5,605
| style="text-align:center; background:honeyDew;" |0.8% 131
|-
| style="text-aligncenter;" |2009
| style="text-aligncenter;" |48.0% 8,292
| style="text-aligncenter;" |45.1% 7,785
| style="text-align:center; background:honeyDew;" |6.1% 1,050
|-
| style="text-aligncenter;" |2005| style="text-aligncenter;" |38.5% 6,111
| style="text-aligncenter;" |56.9% 9,028
| style="text-align:center; background:honeyDew;" |3.0% 472
|}

In the 2013 gubernatorial election, Republican Chris Christie received 64.0% of the vote (10,209 cast), ahead of Democrat Barbara Buono with 35.2% (5,605 votes), and other candidates with 0.8% (131 votes), among the 16,180 ballots cast by the township's 31,967 registered voters (235 ballots were spoiled), for a turnout of 50.6%. In the 2009 gubernatorial election, Republican Chris Christie received 48.0% of the vote (8,292 ballots cast), ahead of Democrat Jon Corzine with 45.1% (7,785 votes), Independent Chris Daggett with 5.5% (948 votes) and other candidates with 0.6% (102 votes), among the 17,277 ballots cast by the township's 29,164 registered voters, yielding a 59.2% turnout.

Education
The Monroe Township School District serves public school students in pre-kindergarten through twelfth grade.Monroe Township Board of Education District Polict 0110 - Identification, Monroe Township School District. Accessed October 7, 2020. "Purpose The Board of Education exists for the purpose of providing a thorough and efficient system of free public education in grades kindergarten through twelfth in the Monroe Township School District. Composition: The Monroe Township School District is comprised of all the area within the municipal boundaries of Monroe Township." As of the 2018–19 school year, the district, comprised of eight schools, had an enrollment of 6,829 students and 533.1 classroom teachers (on an FTE basis), for a student–teacher ratio of 12.8:1. Schools in the district (with 2018–19 enrollment data from the National Center for Education Statistics) are 
Applegarth Elementary School with 439 students in grades 4–5, 
Barclay Brook Elementary School with 314 students in grades Pre-K–2, 
Brookside Elementary School with 400 students in grades 3–5, 
Mill Lake Elementary School with 544 students in grades Pre-K–2, 
Oak Tree Elementary School with 700 students in grades Pre-K–3, 
Woodland Elementary School with 350 students in grades 3–5, 
Monroe Township Middle School with 1,702 students in grades 6–8 and 
Monroe Township High School with 2,330 students in grades 9–12.Monroe Township School District 2013 Report Card Narrative, New Jersey Department of Education. Accessed September 7, 2014. "The district is rapidly growing and now serves over 6000 students in eight schools: Barclay Brook (pre-k-2), Mill Lake (pre-k-2), Oak Tree (pre-k-3), Brookside (3-5), Woodland (3-5), Applegarth (4-5), Monroe Township Middle School (6-8), and Monroe Township High School (9-12)."

With the completion of the new high school in 2013, the former high school was reconfigured as a middle school for grades 6–8, and Applegarth (the former middle school) was added to the district's elementary schools.

During the 1991–1992 academic school year, Mill Lake Elementary School received the National Blue Ribbon Award of Excellence from the United States Department of Education, the highest honor that an American school can achieve. This honor was followed during the 1998–1999 academic school year, to Barclay Brook Elementary School across town. Both of Monroe Township's Pre-K through third grade schools received such an esteemed honor.

About 300 students from Jamesburg attend Monroe Township High School as part of a sending/receiving relationship with the Jamesburg Public Schools that has been in effect since 1980.Cheslow, Jerry. "A Townful of Empty Nesters", The New York Times, October 14, 2007. Accessed December 7, 2019. "Since 1960, when the population stood at 5,831, the township has grown more than sixfold, to 36,000 — fueled in part by the opening in 1968 of the New Jersey Turnpike Exit 8A, but also by the availability of open land and the town’s welcoming attitude.... In addition to the four elementary schools, the Applegarth Middle School teaches Grades 7 and 8, and the 1,400-student Monroe Township High School covers Grades 9 through 12. It is shared with the borough of Jamesburg, the 'hole in the doughnut' municipality in the center of the township."

Eighth grade students from all of Middlesex County are eligible to apply to attend the high school programs offered by the Middlesex County Vocational and Technical Schools, a county-wide vocational school district that offers full-time career and technical education at Middlesex County Academy in Edison, the Academy for Allied Health and Biomedical Sciences in Woodbridge Township and at its East Brunswick, Perth Amboy and Piscataway technical high schools, with no tuition charged to students for attendance.Locations, Middlesex County Vocational and Technical Schools. Accessed December 2, 2019.

Infrastructure

Transportation

Roads and highways

Major highways serving Monroe Township include the New Jersey Turnpike (Interstate 95), Route 32 and Route 33. Exit 8A of the Turnpike is located on the western edge of Monroe Township, with a nine-lane toll gate featuring a "modified" double trumpet interchange (with a few ramps continuing into South Brunswick Township). A number of county routes pass through Monroe Township, including County Route 535, County Route 527, County Route 522, County Route 625, County Route 619, County Route 615, County Route 614, County Route 613 and County Route 612.

Other limited-access roads that are accessible outside the municipality include Interstate 195 in neighboring Millstone Township and the Garden State Parkway in bordering Old Bridge Township.

The New Jersey Turnpike Authority had proposed to build two roads that were to pass through Monroe. This project was terminated in the 1980s. The other was a west–east spur, Route 92. It would have started at U.S. Route 1 just north of the intersection with Ridge Road in the township of South Brunswick and ended at the Exit 8A toll gate in Monroe Township. However, this was cancelled on December 1, 2006, and the Authority instead focused on the Turnpike widening between Exit 6 and Exit 8A.

Public transportation
Rail
In the 19th & 20th centuries, Jamesburg Borough and Monroe Township had a major railway in the area, which was the Freehold and Jamesburg Agricultural Railroad'''. This railway was owned and operated by the Camden & Amboy Railroad Company (C&A), in which surveying for the line began on September 8, 1851, grading began on October 19, 1852, and the first track was laid on April 4, 1853. The first section of line was opened on July 18, 1853. The establishment of the Freehold & Jamesburg Agricultural Railroad caused this region to become a transportation hub. The Freehold and Jamesburg Railroad was abandoned by the early 1930s. A  portion of the former railroad's right-of-way was later approved to be sold by the New Jersey Board of Public Utility Commissioners (PUC) to Jersey Central Power & Light Company in 1966, with occasional freight service still being utilized through the Freehold Industrial Track.

The Monmouth Ocean Middlesex Line is a proposal by New Jersey Transit to restore passenger railway service to the region, by utilizing the same tracks as the Freehold Industrial Track. Jamesburg would be a potential railway stop on the proposed 'MOM' Line.

As of now, the nearest train stations to the Monroe area are located at Metuchen, New Brunswick, and Princeton Junction, all along on the Northeast Corridor Line.

Bus
NJ Transit currently provides bus service to the Port Authority Bus Terminal in Midtown Manhattan on the 138 and 139 routes. Coach USA Suburban Transit and Academy Bus Lines provide weekday commuter service to PABT and to Wall Street.

Middlesex County Area Transit (MCAT) shuttles provide weekday service to and from Monroe on routes operating across the county. The M1 route operates between Jamesburg and the New Brunswick train station, and the M2 route (suspended during the COVID-19 pandemic) connects Jamesburg, Helmetta and Spotswood with East Brunswick, including the Brunswick Square Mall.

Healthcare
Monroe Township is served by CentraState Healthcare System, which is affiliated with Rutgers Robert Wood Johnson Medical School, located in nearby Freehold Township. The regional hospital is a 287-bed medical facility. CentraState Healthcare system also provides healthcare through its various family practices in communities across western Monmouth and southern Middlesex counties in central New Jersey. One of those six family practices has an office located in Monroe on Applegarth Road. The next closest hospitals to the township are Penn Medicine Princeton Medical Center in nearby Plainsboro Township, the Old Bridge Division of Raritan Bay Medical Center in nearby Old Bridge Township, and Saint Peter's University Hospital and Robert Wood Johnson University Hospital in nearby New Brunswick.

Notable people

People who were born in, residents of, or otherwise closely associated with Monroe Township include:

 Randy Beverly (born 1944), cornerback for the New York Jets best known for making two key interceptions that helped the Jets to their historic victory in Super Bowl III in 1969
 Irene Craigmile Bolam (1904–1982), subject of a 1970 book which claimed that she was Amelia Earhart
 Craig Carpenito (born 1973), former United States Attorney for the District of New Jersey
 Nick Dini (born 1993), catcher for the Kansas City Royals
 Peter P. Garibaldi (born 1931), politician who served as mayor of Monroe Township, in the New Jersey General Assembly from 1968 to 1974 and in the New Jersey Senate from 1984 to 1988
 Ben-Ami Kadish (1923–2012), former U.S. Army mechanical engineer who pleaded guilty in December 2008 to being an "unregistered agent for Israel" during the 1980s
 Rabbi Leon Klenicki (1930–2009), advocate for interfaith relations, particularly between Jews and Catholics
 Sophie Lutterlough (1910–2009), entomologist at the Smithsonian National Museum of Natural History
 Dave Meads (born 1964), former MLB relief pitcher who played for the Houston Astros
 Antonio Pierce (born 1978), former Pro Bowl Linebacker for the National Football League's New York Giants
 Frank J. Pino (1909–2007), lawyer and politician
 Edwin Stern (born 1941), lawyer and judge who served as an acting justice on the New Jersey Supreme Court

See also
 Applegarth, New Jersey
 Clearbrook Park, New Jersey
 Concordia, New Jersey
 Greenbriar at Whittingham, New Jersey
 Rossmoor, New Jersey
 Stonebridge, New Jersey

References

External links

Monroe Township Official Website
Monroe Township School District

School Data for the Monroe Township School District, National Center for Education Statistics

 
1838 establishments in New Jersey
Faulkner Act (mayor–council)
Populated places established in 1838
Townships in Middlesex County, New Jersey